Daniel J. LaPlante (born May 15, 1970) is an American convicted murderer serving multiple life sentences for the 1987 murders of Priscilla Gustafson and her two children in Townsend, Massachusetts.

Early life 
LaPlante lived with his mother and stepfather. While growing up in Townsend, LaPlante was sexually and psychologically abused by many adults in his life. LaPlante's father was responsible for the majority of the abuse. He also struggled with school. He was diagnosed with dyslexia at an early age,

Murders and judicial process 
On December 1, 1987, LaPlante entered the Townsend home of Priscilla Gustafson, a nursery school teacher. Gustafson, who was pregnant, was found face-down on her bed, her pillows covered in her blood. LaPlante had raped her and shot her multiple times at point-blank range. LaPlante drowned both of her children (7-year-old Abigail and 5-year-old William) in separate bathrooms. A year later, LaPlante was sentenced to three life sentences for the murders of the Gustafsons.

On March 22, 2017, a re-sentencing hearing for LaPlante was held at Middlesex Superior Court in Woburn, Massachusetts. LaPlante asked for a reduction in his sentence. At the hearing, it was mentioned that during his first appeal, previous court rulings were cited saying that juveniles convicted of murder should be given a meaningful opportunity to re-engage with society. There was also a new law allowing “juveniles convicted of murder with extreme cruelty and atrocity to ask for parole after they’ve been behind bars for a minimum of 30 years.” The judge, however, affirmed LaPlante's' sentence of three consecutive terms of life imprisonment, with the possibility of parole after forty-five years, after a forensic psychiatrist evaluated LaPlante and found that he was not remorseful for his crimes.

Media coverage
LaPlante was featured in Season 2, Episode 1 of Investigation Discovery's Your Worst Nightmare series "Bump in the Night."

LaPlante was also featured in Season 1, Episode 2 of Lifetime Channel's "Phrogging: Hider in My House" series "Footsteps in the Attic," which documented crimes committed prior to the Gustafson murders.

References

Living people
1970 births
Place of birth missing (living people)
American murderers of children
1987 murders in the United States
Family murders
American murderers
American rapists